Dralion (pronounced Drah-lee-on) was a touring production by the Canadian entertainment company Cirque du Soleil. The show combined elements of traditional Chinese circus with Western contemporary circus, complementing the "East-meets-West" theme implied in the title—the name is a portmanteau of "dragon" (representing the East) and "lion" (representing the West). It is Cirque du Soleil's twelfth touring production and the first Cirque show since 1985 not to be directed by Franco Dragone. Dralion performed its final show at the Sullivan Arena in Anchorage, Alaska on January 18, 2015, bringing its fifteen-year world tour to a close.

Set and technical information 
It was covered in perforated aluminum tiles, giving it the appearance of medieval armor or a futuristic Chinese temple. Sitting atop the structure were six giant claws which allow performers to climb the wall and suspend in mid-air. Above the stage itself were three large concentric aluminum rings. The first was utilized as a catwalk; the second was used to support acrobatic equipment; and the third is used by performers to move up and down and suspend in the air.

Portions of the Dralion stage were redesigned and incorporated into the Ovo arena tour in early 2016.

Characters
Dralion featured 50 members in its performance troupe, of which about 5 or 6 play principal characters.
Azala (air): The goddess of air who is dressed in blue, keeper of the sun and the guardian of immortality.
Gaya (earth): The goddess of earth, dressed in ochre.
Océane (water): The goddess of water, dressed in green.
Yao (fire): The god of fire, dressed in red, who is both good and evil.
L'Âme Force: The show's singers who symbolize harmony between the four elements.
Kala: Represents the heart of the wheel of time, making time evolve.
King Bamboo: Represents the force of Fire.
Hibana: A Fire Princess.
Little Buddha: The chosen child who possesses powers that will eventually allow him to become an Âme-Force, but dreams of being a regular child.
Shine: The lover of the air goddess Azala.
Dralions: Mythical creatures inspired by the imagery of the Chinese lion dance and dragon dance. (performed by members of Chinese house troupe) 
Water Nymphs: A group of young girls dress in green, they follow the order of Océane.
Giovanni: A small but nimble man. (1999-2015)
Giovanna: A female version of Giovanni portrayed by Jessica Green. (2003)
The Fools: The original clowns of Dralion consisting of Robert Jetté, Ben Amar-Djalal, Aline Muheim, and Philippe Delaitre. (1999)
Les Voila: A duo of bizarre clowns consisting of Johnny Filion and Soizick Hebert. (1999-2001)
The Mad Italian Waiters: Strange foreigners from a far off land. (2001-2015)

Acts
The acts of Dralion combine unique western and eastern acrobatic skills.

Dance of the Elements: The show began with the goddesses and god of the four elements dancing.
Single Handbalancing: A single woman balances on one hand and accomplishes a variety of poses.
Bamboo Poles: Five acrobats twirl and throw  bamboo poles while Yao waves a flag as the acrobats jump over it.
Juggling: An artist performs juggling infused with breakdancing and modern dance. This act was performed by Viktor Kee but now is performed by Vladik Myagkostoupov.
Trampoline: Surrounding Océane, a group of acrobats perform on trampolines using the set's futuristic backdrop both as a diving board and landing pad.
Crossed Cyr Wheel: A cyr wheel that is infused with another cyr wheel forming a globe. The performer spins and twists this apparatus in an act that represents the circle of life and the passing of time.
Dralions: Three acrobats and three Dralions perform tumbling feats and Chinese lion dance-like dance.
Medusa: A group of artists execute graceful and lithe movements, in the style of acrosport.
Aerial Hoop: A single artist performs choreography using a hoop suspended in mid-air.
Diabolo: Artists perform tricks with diabolos trying to outperform each other.
Aerial Pas de Deux: Azala and her male counterpart perform an aerial dance in silks.
Hoop Diving: Acrobats jump through a tower of hoops, which is sometimes spinning.
Skipping Ropes: A group of acrobats perform jump rope alone or together in pyramids and in towers.

Rotation acts
Contortion: A solo act featuring a very flexible performer who stays in handstands with their legs over their head.
Aerial Straps: Used commonly in place of Aerial Pas de Deux.

Retired acts
Contortion with Bowls: This was a contortion act made even more precarious with the added difficulty of balancing a stack of bowls on the artists head.
Teeterboard: An original Dralion act, it featured an all female troupe. The flyer would stand at one end of the trapeze as two performers jumped onto the opposite end, shooting the flyer up and onto a high tower of other performers.
Ballet on Lightbulbs: An original Dralion act that was unlike anything else. A group of female artists wore ballet pointe shoes and balanced while other performers climbed onto their shoulders creating high towers of people all on a platform of light bulbs.
Double Duplex Trapeze: An original Dralion act, two trapezes that had one bar at the bottom and another bar about a metre above it, the artists would jump or flip from the higher bar into the hands of another performer at the bottom bar.
Foot Juggling: An original Dralion act, this foot juggling act featured a female artist who manipulated and spun an open Chinese parasol on her feet, at one moment she would have a parasol on each foot and each hand, all spinning simultaneously.   
Balancing on Chairs: This act had an artist stack a pile if chairs, at the top of the pile the artist performed a hand-balancing act.
Spirits: Four couples perform a gravity-defying ballet.

Costumes
Dralions costumes are vibrant in color; inspired by clothing from India, China, and Africa; and are shaped according to the movements of each performer's choreography.  In total there are around 1500 wardrobe pieces for the show, taking into account that some artists have up to four costume changes during a single performance.

 Yao: As the symbol of fire, Yao is clad in red and inspired by Chinese.
 Océane: As the goddess of water, Océane's costume is Indian inspired and green in color.
 Azala: As the goddess of air, Azala's primary color is blue.  Her dress is fashioned with Asian crystal beads.
 Gaya: As the goddess of earth, Gaya's color is Ochre. Her costume is inspired by African designs.
 L'Âme Force: The texture on the front of their golden costumes is made by moulding small plastic soldiers.
 Dralions: The dralions are constructed from a mélange of items both natural and synthetic: lycra, leather, silk, mosquito netting, polystyrene foam, springs, raffia, horse hair, emu feathers, and other fabrics and decorations.

Music
With the company's departure from its longtime creative team, Dralion features the work of a new Cirque composer, French-Canadian composer Violaine Corradi. The music of Dralion aims to be a fusion of sounds from East and West by the use of acoustic and electric instruments. Featuring rhythmic and lyrical motifs, the influences range from Indian melodies to sounds from Andalusia, Africa, Central Europe, and the West. Instruments used in the CD are drums, violin, winds, keyboards, guitar and percussion instructions. Released on November 9, 1999, Dralion’s soundtrack features the vocals of Basque counter-tenor Erik Karol, and Canadian female vocalist Agnès Sohier. The tracks for the CD are listed below, with their corresponding acts alongside in italics.Track listing Stella Errans (Single Handbalancing, 1999 - 2015)
 Ombra
 Foot Juggling (Rotation, 1999 - 2010)
 Contortion with Bowls (Rotation, 1999 - 2000)
 Balancing on Chairs (Rotation, 2010 - 2012)
 Contortion (Rotation, 2012 - 2014)
 Spiritual Spiral
 Setup to Double Trapeze, (1999 - 2010)
 Setup to Skipping Rope, (2014 - 2015)
 Miracula Æternitatis 
 Spirits (1999 - 2014)
 Crossed Cyr Wheel
 Bamboo (Bamboo Poles, 1999 - 2015)
 Ballare
 Aerial Pas de Deux, (1999 - 2015)
 Aerial Straps (Rotation, 2010 - 2015)
 Ravendhi (Teeterboard, 1999 - 2005)
 Ninkou Latora
 Double Trapeze (1999 - 2010)
 Crossed Cyr Wheel (2012 - 2015)
 Aborigenes Jam (Hoop Diving, 1999 - 2015)
 Hinkò (Ballet on Lightbulbs, 1999 - 2010)
 Kamandé (Skipping Rope and Finale, 1999 - 2015)
Other songs
 Ambience (Preshow)
 Original Opening (Opening, early 1999)
 Elements (Opening, 1999 - 2015)
 Ledjendia 
 Opening, (1999 - 2015)
 Prelude to Skipping Rope (1999 - August 2014) 
 Naya (Single Handbalancing Intro)
 Exaequo (Juggling Prelude)
 Momma Kee (Juggling, Viktor Kee version, 1999 - 2006)
 Vladik-Jug (Juggling, Vladik Myagkostoupov version, 2006 - 2015)
 Lanterne (Lanterns, 1999 - 2015)
 Soleil Tilt (Soleil Tilt, 1999 - 2015)
 Bombarde (Dralions, 1999 - 2015)
 Shine (Transition, 2001 - 2015)
 Hibana (Aerial Hoop, 2001 - 2015)
 Anima (Aerial Hoop, 2001 - 2015)
 Trampo-Wall (Trampolines, 2005 - 2015)
 Diabolos (Diabolos, 2010 - 2015)
 Medusa (Medusa, 2010 - 2015)
 Hairpiece (Clown act, 2001 - 2015)
 Death (Clown act, 2001 - 2015)
 Imitatio (Clown act, 1999 - 2004)
 Imitatio II (Clown act, 2005 - 2015)

Vocalists

Female SingersAgnès Sohier:
From April 22, 1999 (Montreal) to Fall 2004 (Madrid)
From March 17, 2005 (Barcelona) to January 18, 2015 (Anchorage)Laur Fugère:
From April 4, 2001 to May 20, 2001 (New York City)
From October 2, 2003 to December 14, 2003 (Mexico City)Estelle Esse - From Fall 2004 (Madrid) to February 6, 2005 (London)

Male SingersÉrik Karol:
From April 22, 1999 (Montreal) to January 28, 2001 (Atlanta)
From June 3, 2004 (Vienna) to February 6, 2005 (London)
From September 8, 2005 (Zurich) to February 26, 2006 (Sevilla)Frank Irving - From February 14, 2001 (Miami) to December 16, 2001 (Dallas)Robert Fertitta - From March 6, 2002 (Los Angeles) to December 21, 2002 (Phoenix)Calvin Braxton:
From February 6, 2003 (New Orleans) to May 23, 2004 (Amsterdam)
From March 17, 2005 (Barcelona) to August 28, 2005 (Ostend)
From March 10, 2006 (Geneva) to August 2008 (Sydney)*Cristian Zabala:
2007 - 2008 (Japan)*
From October 21, 2010 (Trenton) to June 9, 2013 (Guatemala City)
From October 2, 2014 (Albany) to January 18, 2015 (Anchorage) Chad Oliver - From July 16, 2008 (Sydney) to January 17, 2010 (Mexico)Josue Anuar''' - From July 9, 2013 (Amnéville) to September 6, 2014 (Palma de Mallorca)*During the 2007-2008 Japan tour, Calvin Braxton and Cristian Zabala alternated the role.Tour
After premiering under the Grand Chapiteau in 1999, "Dralion" was briefly retired in December 2009. In mid-2010, the show began the arena restaging process, having its first dress rehearsal at the John Paul Jones Arena in Charlottesville, VA before beginning its arena tour in October 2010 in Trenton, NJ. After touring for an additional four years in the arena, the show returned to North America in the fall of 2014 to begin its "Farewell Tour". On January 18, 2015, "Dralion" performed for the final time in Anchorage, AK. 

The following colorboxes indicate the region of each performance:  Europe  North America  South and Central America  Asia/Pacific  Oceania
 Africa

Grand Chapiteau tour

1999 schedule

  Montréal, QC - From 22 Apr 1999 (show premiere)''
  Québec, QC - From 24 Jun 1999
  Toronto, ON - From 29 Jul 1999 to 5 Sep 1999
  Santa Monica, CA - From 23 Sep 1999 to 21 Nov 1999
  Irvine, CA - From 2 Dec 1999

2000 schedule

  San Francisco, CA - From 3 Feb 2000
  San Jose, CA - From 6 Apr 2000
  Denver, CO - From 9 Jun 2000
  Minneapolis, MN - From 17 Aug 2000
  Washington, DC - From 11 Oct 2000 to 19 Nov 2000
  Atlanta, GA - From 30 Nov 2000 to 28 Jan 2001

2001 schedule

  Miami, FL - From 14 Feb 2001 to 18 Mar 2001
  New York, NY - From 4 Apr 2001 to 20 May 2001
  Chicago, IL - From 22 Jun 2001 to 15 Jul 2001
  Boston, MA - From 15 Aug 2001 to 16 Sep 2001
  Philadelphia, PA - From 27 Sep 2001 to 4 Nov 2001
  Dallas, TX - From 16 Nov 2001 to 9 Dec 2001

2002 schedule

  Houston, TX - From 17 Jan 2002 to 17 Feb 2002
  Santa Monica, CA - From 6 Mar 2002 to 24 Mar 2002
  San Diego, CA - From 18 Apr 2002 to 12 May 2002
  Portland, OR - From 12 Jun 2002 to 21 Jul 2002
  Seattle, WA - From 1 Aug 2002 to 15 Sep 2002
  Sacramento, CA - From 4 Oct 2002 to 20 Oct 2002
  Phoenix, AZ - From 13 Nov 2002 to 8 Dec 2002

2003 schedule

  New Orleans, LA - From 6 Feb 2003 to 2 Mar 2003
  Raleigh, NC - From 13 Mar 2003 to 5 Apr 2003
  Baltimore, MD - From 11 Apr 2003 to 4 May 2003
  Montréal, QC - From 15 May 2003 to 15 Jun 2003
  Hartford, CT - From 24 Jun 2003 to 13 Jul 2003
  Columbus, OH - From 24 Jul 2003 to 10 Aug 2003
  St. Louis, MO - From 23 Aug 2003 to 14 Sep 2003
  Mexico City, MX - From 2 Oct 2003 to 14 Dec 2003

2004 schedule

(Dralion played in the Royal Albert Hall in London, UK during this time)
  Amsterdam, NL - From 27 Feb 2004 to 23 May 2004
  Vienna, AT - From 3 Jun 2004 to 1 Aug 2004
  Antwerp, BE - From 12 Aug 2004 to 3 Oct 2004
  Madrid, ES - From 15 Oct 2004 to 21 Dec 2004

2005 schedule

(Dralion played in the Royal Albert Hall in London, UK during this time)
  Barcelona, ES - From 17 Mar 2005 to 24 Apr 2005
  Rotterdam, NL - From 3 Jun 2005 to 19 Jun 2005
  Oostende, BE - From 21 Jul 2005 to 28 Aug 2005
  Zurich, CH - From 8 Sep 2005 to 6 Nov 2005
  Bilbao, ES - From 18 Nov 2005 to 8 Jan 2006

2006 schedule

  Seville, ES - From 19 Jan 2006 to 26 Feb 2006
  Geneva, CH - From 10 Mar 2006 to 16 Apr 2006
  Valencia, ES - From 4 May 2006 to 11 Jun 2006
  Málaga, ES - From 22 Jun 2006 to 30 Jul 2006
  Berlin, DE - From 30 Aug 2006 to 5 Oct 2006
  Frankfurt, DE - From 19 Oct 2006 to 26 Nov 2006
  Düsseldorf, DE - From 7 Dec 2006 to 7 Jan 2007

2007 schedule

  Tokyo, JP - From 7 Feb 2007 to 6 May 2007
  Sendai, JP - From 23 May 2007 to 8 Jul 2007
  Osaka, JP - From 25 Jul 2007 to 14 Oct 2007
  Nagoya, JP - From 31 Oct 2007 to 6 Jan 2008

2008 schedule

  Tokyo, JP - From 25 Jan 2008 to 6 Apr 2008
  Fukuoka, JP - From 23 Apr 2008 to 15 Jun 2008
  Sydney, AU - From 16 Jul 2008 to 12 Oct 2008
  Canberra, AU - From 23 Oct 2008 to 16 Nov 2008
  Brisbane, AU - From 27 Nov 2008 to 11 Jan 2009

2009 schedule

  Perth, AU - From 29 Jan 2009 to 25 Mar 2009
  Melbourne, AU - From 10 Apr 2009 to 14 Jun 2009
  Auckland, NZ - From 9 Jul 2009 to 24 Aug 2009
  Monterrey, MX - From 17 Sep 2009 to 11 Oct 2009
  Guadalajara, MX - From 22 Oct 2009 to 15 Nov 2009
  Mexico City, MX - From 26 Nov 2009 to 17 Jan 2010 (final show under Big Top)

Arena tour

2004 schedule

  London, UK - Royal Albert Hall - From 9 Jan 2004 to 15 Feb 2004

2005 schedule

  London, UK - Royal Albert Hall - From 6 Jan 2005 to 6 Feb 2005

2010 schedule

  Trenton, NJ - From 21 Oct 2010 to 24 Oct 2010
  Buffalo, NY - From 27 Oct 2010 to 31 Oct 2010
  Reading, PA - From 3 Nov 2010 to 7 Nov 2010
  Youngstown, OH - From 10 Nov 2010 to 14 Nov 2010
  Windsor, ON - From 17 Nov 2010 to 21 Nov 2010
  Oshawa, ON - From 24 Nov 2010 to 28 Nov 2010
  Worcester, MA - From 16 Dec 2010 to 19 Dec 2010
  Philadelphia, PA - From 21 Dec 2010 to 2 Jan 2011

2011 schedule

  Boston, MA - From 5 Jan 2011 to 9 Jan 2011
  Grand Rapids, MI - From 12 Jan 2011 to 16 Jan 2011
  St. Louis, MO - From 19 Jan 2011 to 23 Jan 2011
  Chicago, IL - From 26 Jan 2011 to 30 Jan 2011
  Mobile, AL - From 2 Feb 2011 to 6 Feb 2011
  Columbus, OH - From 9 Feb 2011 to 13 Feb 2011
  Detroit, MI - From 16 Feb 2011 to 20 Feb 2011
  Austin, TX - From 10 Mar 2011 to 21 Mar 2011
  San Antonio, TX - From 23 Mar 2011 to 27 Mar 2011
  Des Moines, IA - From 30 Mar 2011 to 3 Apr 2011
  Fargo, ND - From 5 Apr 2011 to 7 Apr 2011
  Sioux City, IA - From 9 Apr 2011 to 10 Apr 2011
  Council Bluffs, IA - From 13 Apr 2011 to 17 Apr 2011
  Moline, IL - From 19 Apr 2011 to 20 Apr 2011
  Peoria, IL - From 22 Apr 2011 to 24 Apr 2011
  Madison, WI - From 26 Apr 2011 to 27 Apr 2011
  Green Bay, WI - From 29 Apr 2011 to 1 May 2011
  Rockford, IL - From 4 May 2011 to 8 May 2011
  Kansas City, MO - From 11 May 2011 to 15 May 2011
  Abbotsford, BC - From 2 Jun 2011 to 5 Jun 2011
  Eugene, OR - From 8 Jun 2011 to 12 Jun 2011
  Portland, OR - From 15 Jun 2011 to 19 Jun 2011
  Victoria, BC - From 22 Jun 2011 to 26 Jun 2011
  Penticton, BC - From 29 Jun 2011 to 3 Jul 2011
  Edmonton, AB - From 6 Jul 2011 to 10 Jul 2011
  Saskatoon, SK - From 13 Jul 2011 to 17 Jul 2011
  Winnipeg, MB - From 20 Jul 2011 to 24 Jul 2011
  Frisco, TX - From 27 Jul 2011 to 31 Jul 2011
  Indianapolis, IN - From 3 Aug 2011 to 7 Aug 2011
  Atlanta, GA - From 25 Aug 2011 to 28 Aug 2011
  Duluth, GA - From 31 Aug 2011 to 4 Sep 2011
  Tupelo, MS - From 6 Sep 2011 to 8 Sep 2011
  Huntsville, AL - From 10 Sep 2011 to 11 Sep 2011
  New Orleans, LA - From 14 Sep 2011 to 17 Sep 2011
  Orlando, FL - From 21 Sep 2011 to 25 Sep 2011
  Tallahassee, FL - From 28 Sep 2011 to 2 Oct 2011
  Birmingham, AL - From 5 Oct 2011 to 9 Oct 2011
  Gainesville, FL - From 11 Oct 2011 to 13 Oct 2011
  San Juan, PR - From 19 Oct 2011 to 23 Oct 2011
  Santo Domingo, DO - From 27 Oct 2011 to 30 Oct 2011
  Cypress, TX - From 17 Nov 2011 to 20 Nov 2011
  Beaumont, TX - From 23 Nov 2011 to 27 Nov 2011
  Houston, TX - From 30 Nov 2011 to 4 Dec 2011
  Lafayette, LA - From 6 Dec 2011 to 8 Dec 2011
  Bossier City, LA - From 10 Dec 2011 to 11 Dec 2011
  Little Rock, AR - From 13 Dec 2011 to 14 Dec 2011
  Montréal, QC - From 18 Dec 2011 to 30 Dec 2011

2012 schedule

  Quebec, QC - From 3 Jan 2012 to 8 Jan 2012
  Kingston, ON - From 11 Jan 2012 to 15 Jan 2012
  Loveland, CO - From 2 Feb 2012 to 5 Feb 2012
  Broomfield, CO - From 8 Feb 2012 to 12 Feb 2012
  El Paso, TX - From 15 Feb 2012 to 19 Feb 2012
  Colorado Springs, CO - From 22 Feb 2012 to 26 Feb 2012
  Río Rancho, NM - From 29 Feb 2012 to 4 Mar 2012
  Laredo, TX - From 6 Mar 2012 to 7 Mar 2012
  Corpus Christi, TX - From 9 Mar 2012 to 11 Mar 2012
  Hidalgo, TX - From 14 Mar 2012 to 18 Mar 2012
  College Station, TX - From 21 Mar to 25 Mar 2012
  Highland Heights, KY - From 28 Mar 2012 to 1 Apr 2012
  Cleveland, OH - From 4 Apr 2012 to 8 Apr 2012
  Hamilton, ON - From 26 Apr 2012 to 29 Apr 2012
  Halifax, NS - From 2 May 2012 to 6 May 2012
  Saint John, NB - From 9 May 2012 to 13 May 2012
  London, ON - From 16 May 2012 to 20 May 2012
  Rochester, NY - From 23 May 2012 to 27 May 2012
  Manchester, NH - From 30 May 2012 to 3 Jun 2012
  Syracuse, NY - From 6 Jun 2012 to 10 Jun 2012
  Bridgeport, CT - From 13 Jun 2012 to 17 Jun 2012
  Rosemont, IL - From 20 Jun 2012 to 24 Jun 2012
  Chicago, IL - From 27 Jun 2012 to 1 Jul 2012
  Sunrise, FL - From 19 Jul 2012 to 29 Jul 2012
  Estero, FL - From 1 Aug 2012 to 5 Aug 2012
  Richmond, VA - From 8 Aug 2012 to 12 Aug 2012
  Raleigh, NC - From 15 Aug 2012 to 19 Aug 2012
  Baltimore, MD - From 22 Aug 2012 to 26 Aug 2012
  Atlantic City, NJ - From 29 Aug 2012 to 2 Sep 2012
  Uniondale, NY - From 5 Sep 2012 to 9 Sep 2012
  Charleston, WV - From 12 Sep 2012 to 16 Sep 2012
  Minneapolis, MN - From 19 Sep 2012 to 23 Sep 2012
  Boise, ID - From 11 Oct 2012 to 14 Oct 2012
  Stockton, CA - From 17 Oct 2012 to 21 Oct 2012
  Ontario, CA - From 24 Oct 2012 to 28 Oct 2012
  Long Beach, CA - From 31 Oct 2012 to 4 Nov 2012
  Fresno, CA - From 7 Nov 2012 to 11 Nov 2012
  San Diego, CA - From 14 Nov 2012 to 18 Nov 2012
  Tucson, AZ - From 21 Nov 2012 to 25 Nov 2012
  Phoenix, AZ - From 28 Nov 2012 to 02 Dec 2012
  Topeka, KS - From 05 Dec 2012 to 09 Dec 2012 
  Tulsa, OK - From 12 Dec 2012 to 16 Dec 2012
  Oklahoma City, OK - From 19 Dec 2012 to 23 Dec 2012

2013 schedule

  Dubai, AE - From 6 Feb 2013 to 16 Feb 2013
  Cape Town, ZA - From 5 Mar 2013 to 17 Mar 2013
  Johannesburg, ZA - From 21 Mar 2013 to 1 Apr 2013
  Caracas, VE - From 25 Apr 2013 to 12 May 2013
  Panama City, PA - From 22 May 2013 to 26 May 2013
  Guatemala City, GT - From 5 Jun 2013 to 9 Jun 2013
  Amneville, FR - From 9 Jul 2013 to 13 Jul 2013
  Nice, FR - From 18 Jul 2013 to 28 Jul 2013
  Nantes, FR - From 31 Jul 2013 to 4 Aug 2013
  Doha, QA - From 19 Sep 2013 to 28 Sep 2013                                              
  Beirut, LB - From 10 Oct 2013 20 Oct 2013
  Athens, GR - From 29 Oct 2013 to 3 Nov 2013
  Rome, IT - From 8 Nov 2013 to 17 Nov 2013
  Turin, IT - From 21 Nov 2013 to 24 Nov 2013
  Milan, IT - From 28 Nov 2013 to 1 Dec 2013
  Geneva, CH - From 4 Dec 2013 to 8 Dec 2013
  Basel, CH - From 11 Dec 2013 to 15 Dec 2013
  Barcelona, ES - From 18 Dec 2013 to 29 Dec 2013

2014 schedule

  Lisbon, PT - From 1 Jan 2014 to 12 Jan 2014
  St-Petersburg, RU - From 22 Jan 2014 to 2 Feb 2014
  Chelyabinsk, RU - From 7 Feb 2014 to 16 Feb 2014
  Kazan, RU - From 21 Feb 2014 to 2 March 2014
  Moscow, RU - From 6 Mar 2014 to 16 Mar 2014
  Minsk, BY - From 20 Mar 2014 to 23 Mar 2014
  Herning, DK - From 27 Mar 2014 to 30 Mar 2014
  Wroclaw, PL - From 3 Apr 2014 to 6 Apr 2014
  Malmö, SE - From 1 May 2014 to 4 May 2014
  Glasgow, UK - From 8 May 2014 to 11 May 2014
  Sheffield, UK - From 14 May 2014 to 18 May 2014
  Birmingham, UK - From 22 May 2014 to 25 May 2014
  Dublin, IE - From 28 May 2014 to 1 Jun 2014
  London, UK - From 4 Jun 2014 to 8 Jun 2014
  Manchester, UK - From 11 Jun 2014 to 15 Jun 2014
  San Sebastian, ES - From 3 Jul 2014 to 6 Jul 2014
  Santiago de Compostela, ES - From 10 Jul 2014 to 20 Jul 2014
  Granada, ES - From 23 Jul 2014 to 27 Jul 2014
  Las Palmas de Gran Canaria, ES - From 2 Aug 2014 to 10 Aug 2014
  Bilbao, ES - From 16 Aug 2014 to 24 Aug 2014
  Palma de Mallorca, ES - From 28 Aug 2014 to 6 Sep 2014
  Albany, NY - From 2 Oct 2014 to 5 Oct 2014
  State College, PA - 8 Oct 2014 to 12 Oct 2014
  Wilkes-Barre, PA - From 15 Oct 2014 to 19 Oct 2014
  Charlottesville, VA - From 22 Oct 2014 to 26 Oct 2014
  Sault Ste Marie, ON - From 29 Oct 2014 to 2 Nov 2014
  Fort Wayne, IN - From 5 Nov 2014 to 9 Nov 2014
  Bloomington, IL - From 12 Nov 2014 to 16 Nov 2014
  Cedar Rapids, IA - From 19 Nov 2014 to 23 Nov 2014
  Duluth, MN - From 26 Nov 2014 to 30 Nov 2014
  Kearney, NE - From 3 Dec 2014 to 7 Dec 2014
  Regina, SK - From 10 Dec 2014 to 14 Dec 2014
  Lethbridge, AB - From 17 Dec 2014 to 21 Dec 2014
  Kamloops, BC - From 24 Dec 2014 to 28 Dec 2014
  Prince George, BC - From 31 Dec 2014 to 4 Jan 2015

2015 schedule

  Fairbanks, AK - From 8 Jan 2015 to 11 Jan 2015 
  Anchorage, AK - From 14 Jan 2015 to 18 Jan 2015 (final show)

References

External links
 

Cirque du Soleil touring shows